World Class Championship Wrestling (WCCW), based out of Dallas, Texas held a number of major professional wrestling super shows under the name Wrestling Star Wars between 1981 and 1989, with five of these being held in 1985.

Wrestling Star Wars (January)

Wrestling Star Wars (January 1985) was a professional wrestling supercard show that was held on January 28, 1985. The show was produced and scripted by the Dallas, Texas based World Class Championship Wrestling (WCCW) professional wrestling promotion and held in their home area, Dallas/Ft. Worth, Texas. Several matches from the show were taped for WCCW's television shows and broadcast in the weeks following the show. The show was the 17th overall show in the "Wrestling Star Wars" event chronology and held at the Fort Worth Convention Center, with an estimated 18,000 seat capacity when configured for professional wrestling shows.

Results

Independence Day Star Wars

Independence Day Star Wars (1985) was a professional wrestling supercard show that was held on July 4, 1985. The show was produced and scripted by the Dallas, Texas based World Class Championship Wrestling (WCCW) professional wrestling promotion and held in their home area, Dallas/Ft. Worth, Texas. Several matches from the show were taped for WCCW's television shows and broadcast in the weeks following the show. The show was the 18th overall show in the "Wrestling Star Wars" event chronology. The show, held at the Fort Worth Convention Center, drew 13,000 spectators out if its estimated 18,000 seat capacity when configured for professional wrestling shows.

Results

Labor Day Star Wars

Labor Day Star Wars (1985) was a professional wrestling supercard show that was held on September 2, 1985. The show was produced and scripted by the Dallas, Texas based World Class Championship Wrestling (WCCW) professional wrestling promotion and held in their home area, Dallas/Ft. Worth, Texas. Several matches from the show were taped for WCCW's television shows and broadcast in the weeks following the show. The show was the 19th overall show in the "Wrestling Star Wars" event chronology. The show, held at the Fort Worth Convention Center, drew 8,000 spectators out if its estimated 18,000 seat capacity when configured for professional wrestling shows.

Results

Thanksgiving Star Wars

Thanksgiving Star Wars (1985) was a professional wrestling supercard show that was held on November 28, 1985. The show was produced and scripted by the Dallas, Texas based World Class Championship Wrestling (WCCW) professional wrestling promotion and held in their home area, Dallas, Texas. Several matches from the show were taped for WCCW's television shows and broadcast in the weeks following the show. The show was the 20th overall show in the "Wrestling Star Wars" event chronology. The show, held at the Reunion Arena drew 13,423 spectators out of its approximately 21,000 seat capacity.

Results

Christmas Star Wars

Christmas Star Wars (1985) was a professional wrestling supercard show that was held on December 25, 1985. The show was produced and scripted by the Dallas, Texas based World Class Championship Wrestling (WCCW) professional wrestling promotion and held in their home area, Dallas, Texas. Several matches from the show were taped for WCCW's television shows and broadcast in the weeks following the show. The show was the 21st overall show in the "Wrestling Star Wars" event chronology. The event, held at the Reunion Arena, drew 7,840 spectators out of its approximately 21,000 seat capacity.

Results

References

1985 in professional wrestling
World Class Championship Wrestling shows